Yastrebovsky is a rural locality (a khutor) in Beryozovskoye Rural Settlement, Novoanninsky District, Volgograd Oblast, Russia. The population was 4 as of 2010.

Geography 
Yastrebovsky is located on the Panika River, 36 km northwest of Novoanninsky (the district's administrative centre) by road. Popovsky is the nearest rural locality.

References 

Rural localities in Novoanninsky District